Janam Janam Na Saath is a Gujarati film directed by Mehul Kumar.

Cast
Adil Amaan  
Bhavana Bhatt   
Ramesh Deo  (as Ramesh Dev) 
Dhaval   
Gayatri   
Tahir Hussain   
Iftekhar   
Jagdeep   
Roopesh Kumar   
Raksha Trivedi

External links
 

1977 films
1970s Hindi-language films